Clara Westhoff (21 September 1878 in Bremen – 9 March 1954 in Fischerhude), also known as Clara Rilke or Clara Rilke-Westhoff was a pioneer German sculptor and artist. She was the wife of poet Rainer Maria Rilke.

Early life
At 17, Westhoff went to Munich, where she attended a private art school.  In 1898 she moved to Worpswede and learned sculpture with Fritz Mackensen. She befriended Paula Becker (later Modersohn-Becker) and Ottilie Reylaender, who were  painters there. She continued her studies in 1899 with Carl Seffner and Max Klinger in Leipzig and, in 1900, trained with Auguste Rodin in Paris, also attending the Académie Colarossi.

Personal life
In 1901 she married the poet Rainer Maria Rilke in Worpswede.  Eighteen years later, she moved to Fischerhude with her daughter, Ruth Rilke. Her home there with a studio later became the "Café Rilke", which still exists today.

Career
By 1925 Westhoff had turned to painting so that, in addition to her sculptural work, she created an equally substantial body of work in painting.

Death
She died in Fischerhude on 9 March 1954.

Legacy
Her work was privately owned or barely accessible to the public in various collections. 

With her comprehensive biography in 1986, Marina Sauer initiated a rehabilitation of the artist by freeing Clara Rilke-Westhoff from the shadowy existence of being seen only as the wife of Rilke and as a friend of Paula Modersohn-Becker. Clara Rilke-Westhoff can today be seen as a pioneer among women sculptors in Germany.

References 

1878 births
1954 deaths
20th-century German sculptors
20th-century German women artists
Académie Colarossi alumni
Rainer Maria Rilke
German women sculptors